Bazaar of Peja (/ ) or Peja market  is a market place in the center of the city of Peja, in Kosovo. It was established during Ottoman rule and is located near the  Pećka Bistrica river, between parallel residence zones. The market historically housed blacksmiths and carpenters but also facilitated the agricultural market. The market place was completely destroyed at least twice, once during the Italian occupation in 1943, and once during the Kosovo War (1998–99). The market was fully rebuilt after the Kosovo War, according to the historical Ottoman architecture, and serves as the main market in the city of Peja, and is one of the many monuments which are under protection by the Republic of Kosovo. The main street of the market is known in Albanian as Çarshia e Gjatë.

Gallery

Notes

References

External links

Bazaars in Kosovo
Cultural heritage of Kosovo
Buildings and structures demolished in 1943
Ottoman architecture in Kosovo
Buildings and structures in Peja
Demolished buildings and structures in Kosovo